The Miya people (মিঞা), also known as Na-Asamiya (ন-অসমীয়া lit. neo-Assamese), refers to the descendants of migrant  Bengali Muslims from the modern Mymensingh, Rangpur and Rajshahi Divisions, who settled in the Brahmaputra Valley during the British colonisation of Assam in the 20th-century. Their immigration was encouraged by the Colonial British Government from Bengal Province during 1757 to 1942 and the movement continued till 1947.

Etymology
Miya is derived from mian, an honorific of Persian origin used throughout the subcontinent when addressing a Muslim gentleman. Used pejoratively against the community, the term was re-appropriated by a group of Miya poets who have begun asserting their identity. Miya or Miya Musalman has now begun appearing in serious discourse. The term Na-Asamiya, in the Assamese language, literally means 'neo-Assamese' and was used by the community and the local elites as a new identity in Assam to establish a relationship with the Assamese language. They are also referred to as Charua Musalman, literally meaning Muslims of the chars (riverine islands), because of their preference in settling in the chars; and as Pamua Musalman, literally meaning Muslim farmers, as agriculture is their primary livelihood.

History

Internal migration to Assam 
The internal migration of Bengali Muslims from Rajshahi, Rangpur and Mymensingh divisions of British Bengal presidency (present Bangladesh) to Kamrup (present Assam) started during the census decade of 1901–1911. According to census reports, there was a large-scale migration of human population from eastern Bengal to Assam between 1911 and 1941. 85% of the immigrant population were socially and economically underprivileged Muslims who settled down in the wastelands of Assam. The majority of the internal migrants came from the erstwhile undivided Mymensingh and Rangpur districts of present Bangladesh, What were territories of Kamrupa Kingdom.

The internal migration of Muslims peasants from East Bengal of former Pakistan was officially encouraged prior to the Partition of India by the British imperialists, the All-India Muslim League as well as a section of the Assamese elite; bit it was only considered illegal after the Partition of India in 1947 when Assam belonged to India and East Bengal to Pakistan. Many of these migrant Muslims settled on the chars or riverine islands on the Brahmaputra and other low-lying areas. After the Independence of India in 1947, the group gave up their Bengali linguistic identity, adopting the Assamese language as their native language. Gradually they adopted Assamese culture which has led to them being known as Na-Asamiya (Neo-Assamese, who are Bengali origin). The Na-Asamiyas constitute the largest of the four major Muslim ethnic groups in Assam, who together constitute a third of Assam's electorate.

The local gentry of Assam including matabbars, Barpetia matigiris, Marwaris and Assamese moneylenders encouraged the internal migration out of their own interests. The matabbars (literally meaning 'influential person' in Bengali) were the earlier migrants, who owned large amounts of fallow cultivable lands ranging from 1,000 to 5,000 acres. With the ambition of becoming landlords they would send out the message of availability of cultivable lands to their impoverished kinsmen in their native villages in eastern Bengal. They would then either unofficially lease out their lands to the internal migrant Muslims who arrived later or hire them to cultivate their lands. Thus they would act as de facto landlords. The Barpetia matigiris were a section of Assamese gentry in Barpeta district who made profit by selling excess lands to the internal migrant Muslims and encouraged further migration to make even quicker profits. The Marwaris and the Assamese money lenders financed the internal migrant Muslims for the cultivation of jute, ahu rice, pulses and vegetables.

Demography
Miyas have a population of almost 9.87 million which is spread throughout Assam covering 30% of the state Population, though they are mainly concentrated in Barpeta, Dhuburi, Goalpara, Kamrup, Nagaon, Hojai, Darrang, Chirang, Kokrajhar, South Salmara, Nalbari, Morigaon, Sonitpur and Bongaigaon. The entire south bank of Bramhaputra is now a Miya dominated area. Even on the North bank, districts like Dhubri, Gouripur, Bongaigaon, Kokrajhar, there is a substantial population.

Language
In the Presidential address of the 1940 Assam Sahitya Sabha held at Jorhat. Dr. Moidul Islam Bora, an Assamese Muslim himself, happily noted that a community leader from the migrant Muslim community had proudly acknowledged the community's firm resolution become the part of mainstream Assamese culture. After the Partition of India, the Muslim League dissolved the party in Assam and asked the Muslim people to join the Congress. The Muslim League leadership proposed that the Muslims should accept the language and culture of the country of their residence. Accordingly, the leadership asked the Muslims of Assam to register themselves as Assamese speaking during the census. The leadership also asked the Muslims to identify themselves as Assamese and send their children to Assamese medium schools. As directed by the Muslim League leadership, the migrant Muslims gave up their linguistic identity and adopted Assamese as their language. In the 1951 census, the no. of Assamese speakers in Assam rose to 56.7%.

Gradually the Assamese intelligentsia also began to accept the migrant Muslims in the fold of Assamese identity. Benudhar Sharma, President of 1956 Assam Sahitya Sabha held at Dhubri, felt that the mainstream Assamese people were happy to welcome the internal migrant Muslims into the Assamese fold, just like the Koch, Kachari and Ahoms. By this time the migrant Muslims began to establish Assamese-medium schools and colleges, attempting to merge themselves into the mainstream of Assamese culture. In 1961, the Census Commissioner reported that the Na-Asamiyas were honest in their intent to learn the Assamese language and send their children to Assamese-medium schools. The migrant Muslims thus came to be known as the Na-Asamiyas. To this day, there is not a single Bengali-medium school in the areas dominated by the Na-Asamiyas.

With the official acceptance of Assamese language and close proximity to Goalpariya speakers, the Miya have gradually also developed a creole Miya home language. The Miya officially adopted the Assamese language during the language movement. In formal and official meetings, they are able to switch to Standard Assamese.

Poetry
Many scholars from Miya community are trying to uplift the Miya society through poems (Miya poetry). One of its aims is to reclaim the word "Miya", which is often used pejoratively by non-Muslims. They have chosen poverty, child marriage, population bomb, illiteracy as their subject. The collection of these poems are termed as Miya poetry. In recent time, due to poetic context, Miya poetry has created a controversy in Assam, especially among its indigenous people. The movement started with the publication in 2016 of "Write Down, I am a Miya" by Hafiz Ahmed. There have been complaints by the media and to police that such poetry is "anti-Assamese" even though it is written in the Assamese language.

Notable people
Hafiz Ahmed (born 1962), social activist
Osman Ali Sadagar (1856–1948), politician and educationist

See also 
 Illegal Migrants (Determination by Tribunal) Act, 1983

Notes

References

 
 
 
 

Bengali Muslims
Indian people by ethnic or national origin
Muslim communities lists